Tjurunga is a monotypic genus of Tasmanian sheetweb spiders containing the single species, Tjurunga paroculus. The female of the species was first described by Eugène Simon in 1903 under the name Rubrius paroculus, and it was moved to its own genus in 1967.

See also
 List of Stiphidiidae species

References

Spiders of Australia
Stiphidiidae
Taxa named by Pekka T. Lehtinen